"Angel Eyes" is a 1946 popular song composed by Matt Dennis, with lyrics by Earl Brent. It was introduced in the 1953 film Jennifer. In the film, Matt Dennis sings the song and accompanies himself on piano, while Ida Lupino and Howard Duff among others are dancing to it.

Composition

"Angel Eyes" is a jazz standard which has inspired many interpretations. Many singers have recorded versions of the song, including Nat King Cole (already in 1953), Frank Sinatra, June Christy with Stan Kenton, Chet Baker, Shirley Bassey, Neil Sedaka, Willie Nelson with Ray Charles, and Sting. Ella Fitzgerald, who recorded "Angel Eyes" at least four times, named it her favorite song.
Instrumental versions were recorded not as often as vocal takes, by the likes of Benny Carter, the Modern Jazz Quartet, Dave Brubeck, Kenny Burrell, Joe Albany, and more recently by McCoy Tyner, Gary Thomas and Joe Lovano.

Selected recorded versions

References

Songs with music by Matt Dennis
Frank Sinatra songs
1946 songs
1940s jazz standards
Johnny Mathis songs
Nancy Wilson (jazz singer) songs
Carmen McRae songs
Torch songs
Jazz compositions in C minor